Nina Davuluri (born April 20, 1989) is an American public speaker, advocate, and beauty queen who hosts the reality show Made in America on Zee TV America from Manhattan.

As Miss America 2014, she became the first Indian American contestant to win both the Miss New York followed by the Miss America Competition. She is also the second Asian American to be crowned Miss America.

Early life and education
Davuluri was born on April 20, 1989, in Syracuse, New York, into a Telugu family from India. Her mother is an Information technology specialist, her father was a gynecologist, and her sister is a doctor. When she was six weeks old, Davuluri was brought to live with her grandmother and aunt in Vijayawada, Andhra Pradesh. She stayed there until she was two-and-a-half years old, when her parents brought her back to the United States, returning to India each summer in order to study Indian dance. She is also fluent in Telugu.

Davuluri moved to  Oklahoma when she was four years old. She lived there until she was 10, next moving to St. Joseph, Michigan. This period of her life would become the foundation for her future Miss American platform, "Celebrating Diversity Through Cultural Competency," as its goal is to confront bullying by actively learning to talk about diversity in an open and respectful way.

As a child, Davuluri studied ballet, tap, and jazz dance, and was later in the St. Joseph High School, where she participated in the marching band, played varsity tennis, and was on the Science Olympiad team.  She graduated from St. Joseph in 2007, the same year that her parents moved to Fayetteville, New York. She chose to stay in Michigan, however, first beginning college at Michigan State University, and later transferring to the University of Michigan, where she was a Sigma Kappa/Alpha Mu, was on the Dean's List, and received Michigan Merit and National Honor Society Awards. She graduated in 2011 with a B.S. in brain behavior and cognitive science. She then moved back in with her family in New York, where she took nine pre-med courses at Le Moyne College. Halfway through her tenure as Miss America, however, she announced that she would not be applying to medical school.

Miss Michigan's Outstanding Teen and Miss New York
At the age of 16, Davuluri became interested in beauty pageants after her sister Meena won the title of Miss St. Joseph. As she was too young to enter local pageants, Davuluri became involved with Miss America's Teen division in Michigan, where she also learned that she could earn scholarship money for college. She won the Miss Southwest Michigan's Outstanding  Teen 2005 pageant, followed by the Miss Michigan's Outstanding Teen 2006 pageant, and was first runner-up at the 2007 Miss America's Outstanding Teen pageant. After winning nearly  $25,000 in scholarship money, she stopped competing for a few years and focused instead on her undergraduate education. After graduating from the University of Michigan, Davuluri returned to competing in pageants in order to fund graduate school. In 2012, as a New York resident, she won the title of Miss Greater Rochester, followed by second place in the Miss New York pageant.

Davuluri tried again the following year and won the title of Miss Syracuse. She was then was crowned Miss New York 2013. Davuluri has spoken publicly about losing , her struggle with bulimia, and her belief that "you don't need to be a certain size to be healthy".

Miss America

Davuluri, the first Indian American to win the Miss America pageant (and the second Miss New York in a row), held the title of Miss America 2014 from September 15, 2013, to September 14, 2014. In doing so, she followed in the footsteps of a previous Miss Syracuse/Miss New York, Vanessa Williams, who (as Miss America 1984) was the first African American winner of the pageant. She is also the second Asian American contestant to be crowned Miss America (the first was Filipino American Angela Perez Baraquio in 2001). NPR's Michael Martin commented on this aspect of her win by noting that "there were five Asian-Americans competing for the crown. That's the highest number in pageant history. Three of you were in the top five. Two of you were the finalists, and this in a contest where initially the requirements were that contestants be of good health and of the white race."

Drawing on her background in Kuchipudi and Bharatanatyam, Davuluri danced to the song "Dhoom Taana" from the film Om Shanti Om for her talent performance.  Her routine, the first time Bollywood appeared on the Miss America stage, was developed in conjunction with Nakul Dev Mahajan as a fusion of Bollywood and Indian classical dance. After being crowned Miss America, she said that she was told that she was "never going to win with a Bollywood talent so just go back to singing if you are serious about [winning]."

During the final moments of the pageant, one of the hosts, Lara Spencer, approached the only contestants left on the stage, Davuluri and Miss California Crystal Lee and asked them how they were "feeling." Davuluri replied that both she and Lee were "so proud. We're making history right here, standing here as Asian-Americans." She later described that part of the pageant as "very surreal."

Aftermath

Shortly after she was crowned Miss America 2014, Davuluri became the target of xenophobic and racist commentary in American social media. The news media compared this response to the  backlash against Vanessa Williams after she became Miss America 1984. Congresswoman Grace Meng additionally linked Davuluri's experience to the  antisemitism that Jewish American Bess Myerson faced as Miss America 1945. Many of the comments demanded to know why Davuluri was chosen over the soldier, Miss Kansas Theresa Vail, misidentified her as Muslim or Arab (equating both terms to the word "terrorist"), or associated her with groups such as Al-Qaeda. They also noted the pageant date relative to the September 11 anniversary, and generally expressed anti-Indian sentiments and anti-Arab sentiments. Davuluri later said that she was prepared for the social-media response because she faced a similar situation a few months earlier when she was crowned Miss New York.

Some responded to the backlash in a show of solidarity with Davuluri. Students at Duke University, and with Yale University's Asian American Cultural Center and the South Asian Society, created videos and ran photo campaigns denouncing the social media attacks, while Miss Kansas Theresa Vail blogged and gave interviews to discredit the comments about both herself and Davuluri. Actor and civil-rights activist George Takei (the original Hikaru Sulu in Star Trek) posted a comment on Facebook stating that while he normally doesn't "care about Miss America ... the uproar over an Indian-American winning (whom many decried for being 'Arab') has me shaking my head. Please tell me I'm not alone in wondering whether we've learned anything at all." University of Michigan student Munmun Khan also stated that while she doesn't like beauty pageants, she hates "racism and bigotry even more ... Not only was [Davuluri] the first Indian Miss New York, but she is now also the first Indian Miss America. All cause for celebration." Finally, Immediate Past President, Young Democrats of America, Atima Omara, argued that "a sexist, racist, xenophobic attack against one prominent woman of color is an attack against us all, and it shouldn't be tolerated just because we disdain that woman's choices. As an African-American woman with an ethnic name, I know the constant sting that comes from hearing how you are not American enough no matter how much you accomplish in the name of America."

An editorial by the staff of The Hindu highlighted a different narrative in India and the Indian diaspora regarding her win and colorism. The editorial suggested that rather than hold a pageant title in India, "the dark complexioned 24-year-old [Davuluri] would not have stood a chance ... had she been in India, far from entering a beauty contest, it is more likely that Ms Davuluri would have grown up hearing mostly disparaging remarks about the colour of her skin; she would have been — going by the storyline of most "fairness" cream advertisements — a person with low self-esteem and few friends." Dean Asha Rangappa (Yale Law School) echoed these sentiments when she stated that "Davuluri is following in the footsteps of other darker-skinned Indian women who have been recognized in America for their talent and beauty, like The Office's Mindy Kaling or ER's Parminder Nagra — women who'd never get a second glance in India." Similar remarks appeared in social media and in numerous editorials. Davuluri also discussed the subject with reporters in the American media, stating that she was interested in becoming involved in the "Dark is Beautiful" campaign.

Platform
During her year as Miss America, Davuluri promoted her platform "Celebrating Diversity Through Cultural Competency" and STEM (science, technology, engineering and mathematics) education to high-school and college students.  She elaborated on her platform in a Yale University talk as one using social media as a form of activism. Describing it as "Circles of Unity", she encouraged students to view social media as a tool to spread cultural awareness and combat ignorance.

During Davuluri's visit to Central York High School in Pennsylvania, 18-year-old Patrick Farves was suspended for inviting her to his 2014 prom during a question-and-answer session. Although she requested that the suspension be lifted in a Facebook post, school administrators said that they must maintain standards for student behavior. Farves later stated that he regretted the joke as it overshadowed her platform.

She also met with President Barack Obama for the Children's Miracle Network Hospital Champions at the White House.

Speaker and advocate 
Since completing her year as Miss America in September 2014, Davuluri has worked as a public speaker and advocate for diversity, gender equality, and the promotion of STEM education. In this capacity, she has spoken in both political and diplomatic venues. In September 2014, she shared the stage with PBS' NewsHour Weekend anchor Hari Sreenivasan as hosts for a  Madison Square Garden talk by Indian Prime Minister Narendra Modi. She also participated in the 2015 Global Entrepreneurship Summit Youth and Women Day in Nairobi in July 2015. About a year later, Davuluri traveled to Mumbai, Hyderabad, and Vijayawada as part of an official March 2016 tour for the U.S. State Department to discuss women's education. Part of this tour focused on events connected with International Women's Day (including a talk for the Asia Society).

Davuluri continues to speak on the subjects of diversity and STEM at college campuses. In an October 2014 East Carolina University talk, she discussed the harassment she faced during her childhood." The following month, she spoke on women in STEM at Northeastern University. In March 2015, she spoke at Harvard's  "Side by Side" gender-equality campaign. Later in the same month, she discussed the subject of diversity at Princeton.

Other accolades
 India Abroad Face of the Future Award 2014: India Abroad, June 19, 2015, M69-M82.
 Elected trustee to the Miss America Foundation Board in February 2015 (the first Miss America elected to the board).
 In August 2014 fashion designer Tony Bowls announced that he designed a shoe, "The Nina," in her honor.

Further reading
  Vanita. Fashioning Diaspora: Beauty, Femininity, and South Asian American Culture (Asian American History & Culture). Temple University Press, 2016.

See also

 Indians in the New York City metropolitan area

References

External links

 
 Nina Davuluri: A Poem For Earthy Skinned Women ("Not Fair, Just Lovely") – ScoopWhoop, March 9, 2016.

Miss America and Miss New York
 #StandWithNina: Duke Stands with Miss America – Duke University, September 18, 2013.
 India's Disturbing Obsession with Fair Skin – Time, September 19, 2013.
 "After Defending Miss America From Racial Comments, George Takei Meets Nina Davuluri For First Time" – ABC News, September 17, 2013 (George Takei, Star Trek'''s Sulu).
 George Stephanopoulos." Groundbreaking Miss America Winner Miss New York Takes Home Pageant Crown" –  ABC News, September 16, 2013.
 Lakshmi Gandhi. "Miss America’s Choreographer Nakul Dev Mahajan Tells Us How That ‘Bollywood Fusion’ Dance Came to Be" – The Aerogram, September 20, 2013  (Talent performance to  "Dhoom Taana," from  Om Shanti Om'').
 "America 2014 Nina Davuluri's Crowning Moment." Miss America Organization, September 15, 2013.
 "Vote for Miss New York 2013 Nina Davuluri." Miss America Organization, August 15, 2013.

1989 births
Living people
Television personalities from Syracuse, New York
University of Michigan alumni
Le Moyne College alumni
Miss America winners
Miss New York winners
Miss America 2014 delegates
American people of Telugu descent
Indian-American history
Xenophobia
History of racism in the United States
Nonviolence advocates
People from Fayetteville, New York
American female models
American female models of Indian descent
American people of Indian descent